The U.S. Poker Open is a series of high-stakes poker tournaments. Created in 2018, it takes place at the Aria Resort and Casino in Las Vegas, Nevada, and all final tables are streamed live on PokerGO. In addition to the Main Event, the player who accumulates the most points during the series wins $50,000.

The debut season took place with eight events in February 2018. Keith Tilston won the $50,000 Main Event, while Stephen Chidwick earned series champion honors by winning two events and making five final tables. For the second season in February 2019, the buy-in for the Main Event was increased to $100,000 and a Short Deck variant was added to the schedule.

After not being held in 2020 due to the COVID-19 pandemic, the series returned for its third edition in June 2021. In addition to the $50,000 prize, the series champion will now receive a Golden Eagle trophy. David Peters won three events to earn the series championship for the second consecutive time.

Sean Winter, after being runner-up to Peters in the previous two U.S. Poker Opens, won the final two events of the 2022 series including the $50,000 Main Event for the second straight year to earn the series championship.

Series champions

Main Event winners

Event wins

References

External links
Official website

Poker in Las Vegas
Television shows about poker
Recurring events established in 2018